My Gun Is Quick is a 1957 American film noir crime film directed by George White and Victor Saville (as Phil Victor) and starring Robert Bray.

Plot
Private investigator Mike Hammer, by assisting a prostitute being assaulted, cannot help noticing a unique ring on her finger. Later, when she is found murdered that ring is nowhere to be found. From here the story moves to a cache of jewelry stolen by the Nazis during World War II and smuggled out of France after the war by an American army colonel, who, together with Mike Hammer, tries to find the ring and recover all the other jewels. However, many parties are on the lookout and the private eye runs into big trouble.

Cast
 Robert Bray as Mike Hammer
 Whitney Blake as Nancy Williams
 Donald Randolph as Colonel Holloway (as Don Randolph)
 Richard Garland as Louis
 Fred Essler as Ludwig Teller
 Booth Colman as Capt. Pat Chambers
 Pamela Duncan as Velda
 Genie Coree as Maria (as Gina Coré)
 Patricia Donahue as Dione
 Jan Chaney as Red
 Terence de Marney as Jean (as Terence De Marney)
 Peter Mamakos as La Roche
 Claire Carleton as Nightclub Boss
 Phil Arnold as Shorty

Critical reception
TV Guide noted "The third of UA's Mike Hammer films in the 1950s...the usual number of fisticuffs, killings, and love scenes are presented. This is a lesser work in the series. Though well-crafted, the story is shallow and not really worth the efforts given here. The violence is often senseless and the sex seems to exist only for its own sake. Well produced, but still a boring and tasteless piece"; In a synopsis of the film for Allmovie, Hal Erickson wrote, "Not quite as accomplished as Robert Aldrich's classic Mike Hammer yarn Kiss Me Deadly, My Gun Is Quick works well within its modest limits."

See also
 List of American films of 1957

References

External links
 
 
 

1957 films
1957 crime films
Film noir
Films about prostitution in the United States
1950s mystery films
American detective films
American mystery films
United Artists films
Films based on American novels
Films based on works by Mickey Spillane
Films directed by Victor Saville
Films produced by Victor Saville
1950s English-language films
1950s American films
Mike Hammer (character) films